The 2002–03 Turkish Second League Category A was the second-level football league of Turkey and the 40th season since its establishment in 1963–64. At the end of the season in which 18 teams competed in a single group, Konyaspor, Çaykur Rizespor and Akçaabat Sebatspor, which finished the league in the first three places, were promoted to the upper league, while Erzurumspor, Gümüşhane Doğanspor and Şekerspor, which were in the last three places, were relegated.

Final standings

Results

Top goalscorers

References 

 

TFF First League seasons
Turkey
1